Edelson is a common surname, also sometimes spelled Edelsohn. In Portugal and Brasil it is also sometimes used as a first name.

People
 Michael Edelson (born 1944), investor and director of Manchester United F.C.
 Michael Edelson (lawyer) (born 1949), Canadian criminal defence lawyer
 Becky Edelsohn (1892–1973), anarchist and hunger striker who was jailed in 1914 for disorderly conduct during an Industrial Workers of the World speech
 Stephen M. Edelson, American autism researcher
 Edelson Robson Dos Santos (born 28 January 1983), Brazilian born Russian futsal player also known as Robinho

Other
 Edelson LLC, American law firm, previously known as Edelson McGuire.